Robert-Henri Bautier (19 April 1922, Paris – 19 October 2010, Paris) was a French historian, archivist, and medievalist. He was elected a member of the Royal Academy of Science, Letters and Fine Arts of Belgium in 1986.

Works 
 Helgaud de Fleury. Vie de Robert le Pieux, 1965 (édition et traduction annotée, with coll. by G. Labory)
 Recueil des actes d’Eudes, roi de France (888–898), 1967 
 Les sources de l’histoire économique et sociale du Moyen Âge. 1re série (1968–1974), Provence, Comtat Venaissin, Dauphiné, États de la maison de Savoie. 2e série (1984), États de la maison de Bourgogne (in collaboration with J. Sornay), 1968–1984
 André de Fleury, 1969 (édition et traduction annotée, in collaboration with G. Labory)
 The economic development of Medieval Europe, 1971 
 Recueil des actes de Louis II le Bègue, Louis III et Carloman, rois des Francs (877–884), 1979 (in collaboration with F. Grat, J. de Font-Réaulx and G. Tessier)
 La France de Philippe Auguste : le temps des mutations, 1982 (collective)
 Les origines de l’abbaye de Bouxières-aux-Dames (diocèse de Toul). Reconstitution du chartrier et édition critique des chartes antérieures à 1200, 1987 
 Chartes, sceaux et chancelleries : études de diplomatique et de sigillographie médiévales, 2 vol., 1990
 Vocabulaire international de la sigillographie, 1990
 Recherches sur l’histoire de la France médiévale : des Mérovingiens aux premiers Capétiens, 1991 
 Études sur la France capétienne : de Louis VI aux fils de Philippe le Bel, 1991
 Sur l’histoire économique de la France médiévale : routes, foires, draperies, 1992
 Château de Langeais : histoire et guide-itinéraire du Musée, 1992
 Le Musée Jacquemart-André à Chaalis : historique de l’abbaye royale de Chaalis et guide-itinéraire des collections du Musée, 1992
 Commerce méditerranéen et banquiers italiens au Moyen Âge, 1992
 Vocabulaire international de la diplomatique, 1994

See also 
 List of archivists

References

1922 births
Writers from Paris
2010 deaths
École Nationale des Chartes alumni
Academic staff of the École Nationale des Chartes
French archivists
French medievalists
Members of the Académie des Inscriptions et Belles-Lettres
Officiers of the Légion d'honneur
French male non-fiction writers
Fellows of the British Academy
Members of the Royal Academy of Belgium
Corresponding Fellows of the Medieval Academy of America